The Life of St. Sava was the second biography of Saint Sava (1169–1236), the first Archbishop of Serbs (s. 1219–1235), written by Serbian monk Teodosije the Hilandarian (1246–1328), after the first biography written in 1254 by monk Domentijan.

See also
List of medieval Serbian literature

Further reading
 
 

Medieval Serbian literature
13th century in Serbia
13th-century manuscripts
Nemanjić dynasty
History of the Serbian Orthodox Church
Works about religious leaders
Serbian manuscripts
Cyrillic manuscripts
Christian hagiography